Kimlinh Tran (born December 12, 1989),  also known by the online pseudonym Hnilmik, is an American voice actor from California. She has done voice work for various anime and video games, as well as several online anime parody fandubs, most notably as Chi-Chi in TeamFourStar's Dragon Ball Z Abridged.

Career
Tran is best known for her voice acting work on various video games, especially for her role of Fidget from Dust: An Elysian Tail and Ms. Fortune from Skullgirls. She has recorded voices for video game developers such as Winter Wolves (Always Remember Me, Loren The Amazon Princess) and Wadjet Eye Games (Gemini Rue). She also voiced over 200 Internet projects.

Personal life 
Tran identifies as asexual and non-binary (specifically demigirl), and uses both she/her and they/them pronouns. She is of Vietnamese descent.

Filmography

Animation
 Attack on Titan: Abridged – Mikasa Ackerman
 Beyblade Burst – Valt Aoi (Seasons 3-present)
 Cells at Work! – Immature Thymocyte
 Dragon Ball Z: Abridged – Chi-Chi, Godzirra Girl
 Fight Ippatsu! Jūden-chan!! – Charger Girl Engineer
 Hellsing Ultimate Abridged – Yumie Takagi
 Kagemono: The Shadow Folk – Fox
 K-On! Season 2 – Shizuka Kinoshita, Keiko Sano, Kimiko Makigami, Additional Voices
 MapleStory: New Leaf Saga – EP05 – Farah
 Nura: Rise of the Yokai Clan – Additional Voices
 Pokémon the Movie: Secrets of the Jungle - Koko
 Sanity Not Included – Amanda
 Secret Millionaires Club "Be Cool To Your School" – Additional Voices
 Squid Girl Volume 2 – Additional Voices
 The Terrain of Magical Expertise (TOME) – Granda
 Toradora! – Additional Voices
 Tweeny Witches – Additional Voices
 The Beachbuds - PonPon

Video games
 Always Remember Me – Amarantha Finch
 Apotheon – Ares Warrior, Imprisoned Nymph
 Backstage Pass – Professor Meridia
 Cookie Run: Kingdom - Kumiho Cookie
 Cryamore – Bliss Barson
 Eternally Us – Fiona "Fio" Mackenzie
 Dust: An Elysian Tail – Fidget
 DreadOut – Dedemit Pintu, Jurig Pengantin, Palasik
 Galactic Phantasy Prelude – Emma Rose, Ship A.I.
 Gemini Rue – Edward Wong Hau Pepelu Tivrusky IV
 Haunt the House: Terrortown – Ghost Boy, Humans
 Heroes of Newerth – Queen Serecta, Ven, Lightningbringer, Penitent Lodestone
 Loren The Amazon Princess – Loren
 Monster Strike – Sima Yi, Huang Gai, Coral, Pearl, Homumi, Gigabeast Fighters, Poca-Poco, Decarabia
 Rival Threads: Last Class Heroes – Maya Pendleton 
 Skullgirls – Ms. Fortune, Robo-Fortune
 Snipperclips – Snip, Clip
 Stick It To The Man – Heart the Dog, Cranky Nurse, Maria, Beatrice the Dog, Maggie McAllister, Christina the Ghost Girl, Nurses, Black Widow, Alien Lady, Donna Grandiosa, Sentient Missile, Fetus, Soap Opera Woman
 Wargroove – Ragna 
 Zombie Vikings – Ravens, Duck Girl, Pinata Maggot, Toughy Scout, Maggot Guards, Sally the Maggot
 Zwei: The Ilvard Insurrection – Exmachina

Crew member
 Haunt the House: Terrortown – Casting Coordinator, Voice Director

Notes

References

External links
 
 
 

1989 births
American voice actors
American video game actors
Actors from California
American casting directors
American voice directors
Living people
American non-binary actors
Asexual non-binary people
American people of Vietnamese descent